Carsten Ball and Izak van der Merwe were the defending champions but chose not to defend their title.

Travis Rettenmaier and Ken Skupski won the title after defeating Sergei Bubka and Alexander Kudryavtsev 6–3, 6–4 in the final.

Seeds

Draw

References
 Main Draw

Volkswagen Challenger - Doubles